An ecohouse is an environmentally low-impact home.

Ecohouse may also refer to:

 The First Ecological House, an experimental housing unit at Thames Polytechnic - see Street Farm
 The Ecology House, a housing unit at Cornell University's North Campus - see Cornell North Campus
 A 1999 episode of the British television series Grand Designs - see List of Grand Designs episodes
 An episode of This is Emily Yeung - see List of This Is Emily Yeung episodes